Operation Tungsten was a Second World War air raid conducted by the Royal Navy that targeted the German battleship Tirpitz at her base in Kaafjord in the far north of Norway on 3 April 1944.

The damage inflicted during the attack was not sufficient to sink or disable the ship, but she suffered considerable damage to her superstructure and unarmored areas, with 122 members of her crew killed and 316 were wounded. Tirpitz was eventually disabled and then sunk by Royal Air Force heavy bombers later in the year.

Home Fleet forces dispatched

The Home Fleet had responsibility for conducting the attack. The ships involved sailed from the Home Fleet's base at Scapa Flow in two groups on 30 March 1944.

Force One 
Vice-Admiral Bruce Fraser
 
 827 Naval Air Squadron (12 Fairey Barracudas)
 829 Naval Air Squadron (9 Barracudas)
 1834 Naval Air Squadron (14 Vought F4U Corsairs)
 1836 Naval Air Squadron (14 Corsairs)
 2 King George V-class battleships (10 × 14-inch main btty, 28 kn)
  (flagship of Admiral Bruce Fraser)
  (flagship of Vice-Admiral Henry Moore)
 1 Town-class light cruiser (12 × 6-inch main btty, 32 kn)
 
 6 destroyers
 2 U-class: ,

Force Two 

Rear-Admiral Arthur La Touche Bisset
 
 801 Naval Air Squadron (9 Supermarine Seafires)
 880 Naval Air Squadron (9 Seafires)
 830 Naval Air Squadron (9 Barracudas)
 831 Naval Air Squadron (12 Barracudas)
 
 800 Naval Air Squadron (10 Grumman F6F Hellcats)
 804 Naval Air Squadron (10 Hellcats)
 
 842 Naval Air Squadron (12 Fairey Swordfish and 8 Grumman F4F Wildcats)
 
 881 Naval Air Squadron (10 Wildcats)
 896 Naval Air Squadron (10 Wildcats)
 
 882 Naval Air Squadron (10 Wildcats)
 898 Naval Air Squadron (10 Wildcats)
 3 light cruisers
 1 Dido-class (8 × 5.25-inch main btty, 32.25 kn):  (flagship of Rear-Adm. Bisset)
 1 Fiji-class (12 × 6-inch main btty, 31.25 kn): 
 1 Southampton-class (12 × 6-inch main btty, 32 kn): 
 9 destroyers
 1 W-class: 
 1 S-class: 
 1 O-class: 
 1 N-class: ORP Piorun
 1 J-class: 
 2 fleet support tankers 
 RFA Blue Ranger, RFA Brown Ranger

Composition of strike forces

On 1 April Admiral Fraser decided to conduct the strike on 3 April rather than 4 April as originally planned. This led to the following organisational changes:
HMS Duke of York escorted by HMS Matchless and Marne detached from Force One and cruised to the west
The remainder of Force One sailed to join Force Two, with the two forces combining on the afternoon of 2 April
The Royal Fleet Auxiliary tankers Blue Ranger and Brown Ranger, escorted by the destroyers HMS Javelin and ORP Piorun, were detached from Force Two on 1 April

The attack on Tirpitz and the anti-aircraft batteries and ships located near her mooring at Kaafjord on 3 April involved two strike forces:

1st strike

No. 8 Torpedo Bomber Reconnaissance Wing
827 Naval Air Squadron
830 Naval Air Squadron
Fighter escorts
Elements, 1834 and 1836 Naval Air Squadrons
800 Naval Air Squadron
881 Naval Air Squadron
882 Naval Air Squadron

2nd strike

No. 52 Torpedo Bomber Reconnaissance Wing
829 Naval Air Squadron
831 Naval Air Squadron
Fighter escorts
Elements, 1834 and 1836 Naval Air Squadrons
804 Naval Air Squadron
896 Naval Air Squadron
898 Naval Air Squadron

References
Citations

Works consulted

World War II orders of battle